The 2023 Korn Ferry Tour is the 33rd season of the top developmental tour for the PGA Tour in men's golf, and the fourth under the sponsored name of Korn Ferry Tour.

Changes for 2023
Unlike in previous seasons, the Finals will not have a separate points list; the top 30 point earners through the entire season, including the Finals, will earn PGA Tour cards. A rule change announced in December 2022 allows for Korn Ferry Tour members that qualify for the U.S. Open, then make the 36-hole cut, to earn Korn Ferry Tour points equivalent to FedEx Cup points earned for their finish.

Schedule
The following table lists official events during the 2023 season.

Notes

References

External links
Official schedule

2023
2023 in golf
Current golf seasons